The 2016 Kyrgyzstan Cup was the 25th season of the Kyrgyzstan Cup knockout tournament. The cup winner qualified for the 2017 AFC Cup.

Round 1

Round 2

Quarter-finals
 [Jul 6]
 Ala-Too            0-3 Abdish-Ata-2       
 [Aug 3]
 Alay               2-1 Abdish-Ata         
 Alga               2-4 Dordoy             
 Aldier             1-1 Alay-2             [3-5 pen]

Semi-finals
 First Legs
 [Aug 7]
 Alay-2             0-6 Alay               
 [Aug 9]
 Dordoy             5-0 Abdish-Ata-2       
 
 Second Legs [Aug 14]
 Alay               4-0 Alay-2             
 Abdish-Ata-2       2-3 Dordoy

Final
 [Sep 18]
 Dordoy             1-0 Alay               
   [David Tetteh 60]

See also
2016 Kyrgyzstan League

References

Kyrgyzstan Cup seasons
Kyrgyzstan
Kyrgyzstan Cup